David Revivo (born 5 December 1977) is an Israeli footballer who plays for Ramat Hen.

He is the second-greatest goal-assist provider in Israel's history with 104 assists in the Israeli Premier League.

Career
The younger brother of Haim Revivo, he too was recognized early in his youth for having a great footballing potential and joined the youth system of Maccabi Tel Aviv. Later he transferred to his hometown of Ashdod. After six seasons in Ashdod, Revivo finished his contract and went on trial at Los Angeles Galaxy in the American Major League. According to media reports in Israel, Revivo impressed manager Steve Sampson but was not offered a contract because Sampson was sacked shortly after Revivo had returned to Israel. Subsequently, Revivo signed a new deal with Ashdod.

In October 2019, Revivo joined Maccabi HaShikma Ramat Hen.

Honours
Israeli Premier League
Runner-up (1): 1998–99
Toto Cup
Winner (1): 1998–99
Runner-up (5): 1997–98, 2001–02, 2004–05, 2005–06,  2008–09

References

1977 births
Living people
Israeli Jews
Israeli footballers
Israel international footballers
Maccabi Tel Aviv F.C. players
F.C. Ashdod players
Hapoel Be'er Sheva F.C. players
Beitar Jerusalem F.C. players
Hapoel Haifa F.C. players
Maccabi Yavne F.C. players
Hapoel Bnei Lod F.C. players
Hapoel Marmorek F.C. players
Hapoel Bnei Ashdod F.C. players
Hapoel Ashdod F.C. players
Maccabi HaShikma Ramat Hen F.C. players
Liga Leumit players
Israeli Premier League players
Israeli people of Moroccan-Jewish descent
Footballers from Ashdod
Association football midfielders